Heterophleps triguttaria, the three-spotted fillip, is a species of geometrid moth in the family Geometridae. It is found in North America.

The MONA or Hodges number for Heterophleps triguttaria is 7647.

References

Further reading

External links

 

Larentiinae
Articles created by Qbugbot
Moths described in 1854